Woodview Park is an unincorporated community in Paris Township, Union County, Ohio, United States.

References 

Unincorporated communities in Union County, Ohio